The M1867 Russian Krnka (Винтовка Крнка́) was a breech loading conversion of the muzzle-loading Model 1857 Six Line rifle musket designed by Austro-Hungarian arms maker, Sylvester Krnka.

History 
It was adopted by the Russian Empire in 1869, and was similar to the contemporary Snider-Enfield and Tabatiere conversions. Conversions were carried out at the Tula armory (TOZ).

Two main versions were produced: infantry and cavalry rifles. Shortly after its introduction to service, the M1867 was replaced by the Berdan rifle, though both weapons would serve simultaneously for a time. The rifles were issued to conscripts and police forces in the Central Asian territories, like Samarkand.

After being taken out of service, many Krnka rifles were converted into cheap smoothbore hunting shotguns.

References

Sources
MilitaryRifles.com: Russian Krnka

1867 introductions
Early rifles
Hinged breechblock rifles
Tula Arms Plant products
Rifles of the Russian Empire
Russo-Japanese war weapons of Russia